Yarralumla may refer to:

 Government House, Canberra, the residence of the Governor-General of Australia known as Yarralumla
 Yarralumla, Australian Capital Territory, a suburb of Canberra
 Yarralumla Primary School